The North Linn Community School District is a rural public school district headquartered in Troy Mills, Iowa (the mailing address and physical location is outside of Troy Mills, though the street address is Coggon).

The district is span northern Linn County, southern Buchanan County, southwestern Delaware County, and a small area of northeastern  Benton County.  It serves the unincorporated town of Troy Mills, the towns of Coggon, Walker, and the surrounding rural areas.

The school mascot is the Lynx, and their colors are burgundy and white.

The district hired Dave Hoeger as superintendent in April 2020, replacing the retiring Doug Tuetken.  He will also replace Tuetken as the shared superintendent with Maquoketa Valley.

Schools
The district operates three schools in one facility outside of Troy Mills:
 North Linn Elementary School
 North Linn Middle School
 North Linn Senior High School

North Linn Senior High School

Athletics
The Lynx participate in the Tri-Rivers Conference in the following sports:
Football
Cross Country
 Girls' 1999 Class 1A State Champions
Volleyball
Basketball
Wrestling
Golf
Track and Field
 Girls' 2-time Class 1A State Champions (2004, 2005)
Baseball
Softball

Enrollment

See also
List of school districts in Iowa
List of high schools in Iowa

References

External links
 North Linn Community School District

School districts in Iowa
Education in Linn County, Iowa
Education in Buchanan County, Iowa
Education in Delaware County, Iowa
Education in Benton County, Iowa
School districts established in 1966
1966 establishments in Iowa